Redwall is an animated television series produced by the Canadian Nelvana, along with the France-based Alphanim (season 1) and Germany-based TV-Loonland AG (seasons 2–3) that ran from 1999 until 2002. The series is based on the Redwall novels by Brian Jacques. The series spans three seasons, the first based on the first book Redwall, the second on Mattimeo and the third on Martin the Warrior.

The series originally aired on Teletoon in Canada, along with being independently distributed in the U.S. by American Public Television through public television stations.

Plot

Redwall 
A young mouse named Matthias lives at Redwall Abbey. Reminiscing on his past life, he remembers how his family was very poor. During a particularly harsh winter, an army of Rats, led by Cluny the Scourge, attacked his village. Separated from his family, Matthias saw Cluny just before he was rescued by his sister and, with advice from voles, travelled to Redwall Abbey, with the memory of Cluny still fresh in their minds. After difficult travels, Matthias' sister collapsed, and Matthias followed soon after. When he came to, he found that he had been brought to Redwall Abbey, where the fathers of the abbey later informed him that his sister had died of exhaustion from the journey. Matthias was then raised in the abbey as a novice, yet dreamed of becoming a great warrior like Martin, the warrior-mouse that helped found Redwall. When he joined Constance the Badger in escorting some woodlanders from a feast at the Abbey, he was shocked when he spotted Cluny and his rats marching onto Redwall, taking a nearby church as their main base. Cluny and his captains went to Redwall, claiming to be travelers until they were inside, when Cluny makes his demands clear. In a fit of rage, Matthias attacked them, telling them exactly what he thought of them. Cluny and his captains were forced to leave when Constance threatened to kill them if they did not leave. When he was forced outside, Cluny instructed his only climber, the ninja-esque Shadow, to steal the image of Martin from the tapestry to reduce Redwall's morale. Shadow was successful, but was intercepted by Matthias, and fell to his death from the walls. Cluny then took the image of Martin as his war standard. However, Cluny had nightmares about Martin and Matthias for as long as the tapestry was in his possession. This was soon remedied when Matthias's friends, Jess Squirrel and Basil Stag Hare, stole the tapestry back.

After a number of battles, Matthias was busily looking for Martin's sword, theorizing that they could drive Cluny away if they found it. With old Methuselah the abbey recorder and Cornflower (a young mouse who Matthias was close friends with), they discover that Matthias was to be the next Abbey warrior, like Martin before him. Through a riddle they found under the tapestry, they discovered Martin's tomb underneath a set of stone stairs, and there they found Martin's shield and sword-belt. Next, Matthias found Martin's sheath in the roost of the Sparra, a tribe of savage sparrows living in the roof spaces, ruled by the insane King Bull Sparra. Matthias stole the sheath from the Sparra, killing Bull Sparra in the process, and befriended a young Sparrow named Warbeak. However, he learned that the sword was taken from the Sparra by Asmodeus Poisonteeth, a huge snake. On a journey to find information, Matthias met the Guosim Shrews, a tribe of argumentative shrews who told him to speak to a large snowy owl named Captain Snow for information. Snow told him that Asmodeus lives in a nearby quarry, but mocked Matthias for thinking he could stand a chance against the snake. In fact, he bet Matthias that if he got the sword, he would give up eating mice (and shrews), as well as apologise to Julian Gingivere, a vegetarian cat who used to be friends with Snow, until he banned Snow from his home because of his manners and taste in food. Matthias, after a brief return to the Abbey, set off on an expedition to find the sword, with help from the Guosim. They followed Asmodeus to the large quarry. There, Matthias found the sword, and in a fierce battle with the snake, decapitated him. Meanwhile, Cornflower discovered Martin's old battle-armour in an abbey attic.

Throughout this period, Cluny had been using various tactics to try to take over Redwall, including tunnelling in, using a battering ram, blackmailing a spice-merchant dormouse to kidnap Cornflower as ransom, burning the gates, using a siege tower, and sneaking his soldiers in with a visiting local circus. Every single time the rats failed, and Cluny began to show signs of insanity.

While Matthias was away gathering more troops to fight the rats, Cluny forced a dormouse he had captured to sneak into Redwall and open the gates from the inside. Cluny and his army entered the Abbey at last. However, Matthias came back, dressed in Martin's armour, alongside an army of shrews and sparrows that he had gathered. He found that Cluny had taken over, and was about to execute all the Redwallers (starting with Cornflower). The sight of Matthias dressed as the mouse he had seen in his dreams terrified Cluny, who sent his troops against Matthias and his army. During the ensuing battle between Cluny's army and the mixed defenders of Redwall (The Defenders of Redwall, the Guosim, and the Sparra), Cluny kidnapped Cornflower and hid in the belltower. When Matthias followed them in, Cluny ambushed him, and a duel began, which led them both up to the top of the belltower. Cluny jumped down and caught Cornflower again, threatening to kill her if Mathias did not come down to face him. Mathias swore to, if Cluny released her. Cluny released Cornflower, but Matthias cut the bellropes, causing the Abbey-bell to crash down onto Cluny, killing him instantly.

In the aftermath of the battle, Abbot Mortimer was fatally wounded. Before he died, he declared Matthias to be the Abbey warrior, and that Cornflower would be his wife.

In the epilogue, we see how life in Redwall is back to normal. The Sparra are now ruled by Warbeak who is a good ruler, and the Sparra are now friends with the Redwallers. Some of the Guosim Shrews have chosen to stay at Redwall, and have become beekeepers (even learning to speak to the bees, so they can argue with them). The new abbot is brother Mordalfus, previously known as brother Alf, who used to run the Abbey Pond. Matthias and Cornflower are now happily married and have a son, named Mattimeo (which is somehow short for Matthias Methuselah Mortimer (possibly MATThIas MEthuselah mOrtimer)). The new Abbey Recorder, John Churchmouse, signs off saying that the gates of Redwall are always open to travellers, inviting the viewer to visit if they are ever passing.

Mattimeo
Several seasons after the death of Cluny, Matthias and Cornflower had a son, Mattimeo. But one night, as the Redwallers were celebrating, they were interrupted by the masked fox, Slagar the Cruel, who was previously known as Chickenhound, who entered Redwall with a band of rodents, drugged everyone and kidnapped all of their children. Matthias, Basil Stag Hare and Jess headed out to save them, gaining new and old allies along the way, such as Orlando the Axe, the Guosim shrews, and the "Sparra".

Meanwhile, in their absence, things started to go wrong for Redwall. It came under attack by ravens, led by General Ironbeak. The ravens took all of their food and the dormitories, leaving Cavern Hole as the only free location. However, the Redwallers struck back by using Martin's armor as a ghost to scare the raven. They later saved a mountain bird named Stryk Redkite, who was being harassed and later hurt by the ravens. Eventually, Ironbeak figured out their little trick after seeing Constance the badger going to put away Martin's armour. He locked her in the gatehouse and had his troops take Cavern Hole. Constance was able to break out and save the Redwallers as a newly recovered Stryk killed Ironbeak. The other ravens left Redwall.

Matthias and company were able to follow Slagar's trail to an old buried abbey, Loamhedge, where a cult of rats who worshiped Malkariss, were enslaving others. The fight ended with the slaves stoning Malkariss to death and Matthias setting them free. Eventually, they won with the abbey sinking into the earth. At the surface, Slagar tried to get back at Matthias for the death of his mother but ended up falling into the hole from which he escaped.

Company returned to Redwall with the young ones and slaves. After seven seasons, things were going peacefully at Redwall. The slaves of Malkariss and Matthias' companions settled in Redwall. Matthias, Basil and Orlando began training Redwall's next generation of defenders.

Martin the Warrior
At the same seventh season after Matthias returned, the Redwallers listen to Tim Churchmouse, who tells the tale of how their hero, Martin, became the warrior he is known as today. In the lands of the Marshank coast, the terrible Badrang the Tyrant was increasing his piracy attacks, forcing Luke the Warrior, Martin's father, to go out to sea to combat the sea rats. He left his son his sword and told him to never let another creature take it. Years later, Martin was captured by Badrang and his sword taken. The young mouse served many years in the fortress of Marshank as a slave. When he defended an old squirrel named Barkjon, Badrang had him hung outside in the rain with hungry gulls to peck at him and was later put in the prison pit with Barkjon's son, Felldoh, and a mouse named Brome. Meanwhile, Badrang's old shipmate, Tramun Clogg, arrived to take Marshank. Brome's sister, Laterose, also known as Rose, and her friend, the mole Grumm, also arrived and began digging their way into the prison pit while Clogg began his siege. The five made it to Clogg's boats and managed to commandeer one. However, the boat had a hole, flooding it. A raging storm and a fish separated the group. Martin, Rose and Grumm ended up captured by pygmy shrews and met a hedgehog by the name of Pallum. After saving Queen Amballa's son, Dinjer, they were free to go to Noonvale, Rose's home.

Meanwhile, Brome and Felldoh washed up somewhere else, meeting the Rosehip Players, a traveling circus who agreed to help them free the slaves of Marshank. Managing to win Clogg's amusement, they got inside Marshank and freed most of the slaves. A few days later, Brome disguised himself as one of the rats to get inside, and freed the other slaves through the prison pit's tunnel.

En route to Noonvale, the company made many friends, such as the Warden of Marshwood Hill and Boldred the owl and enemies like the uncivilized cannibalistic lizards and the rogue Gawtrybe. With help from the shrews and otters, they made it to Noonvale but were unable to raise an army to defeat Badrang. However, many were drawn to Martin's cause, including the Gawtrybe as he made his way to Marshank.

Clogg took his opportunity to capture Marshank while Badrang was out. However, Badrang knew of the tunnel in the prison pit. He had Clogg's soldiers swear allegiance to him while Clogg became Marshank's one man slave operation. Felldoh became so obsessed with Marshank's fall that he began solo attacks against it. When he faced Badrang head-to-head, he was beaten to death by his minions. It wasn't until Martin arrived with his army that he forced Badrang into a corner. Martin's army burned down Marshank's gate, and began their attack. In the confusion, Martin retrieved his father's sword and slew Badrang with it. Unfortunately, Badrang had stabbed and killed Rose during the battle. The Fur and Freedom Fighters returned to Noonvale, where it will remain a secret, while Martin continued on his own path.

Episodes

Characters

Voice cast

Redwall 
Tyrone Savage as Matthias
Alison Pill as Cornflower
Janet Wright as Constance
Chris Wiggins as Abbott Mortimer
Richard Binsley as Basil Stag Hare
Wayne Robson as Methuselah
Diego Matamoros as Cluny the Scourge 
David Hemblen as Asmodeus Poisonteeth 
Susan Roman as Jess Squirrel
Graham Haley as Foremole
John Stocker as Brother Alf
Tracey Moore as Warbeak Sparra
Marion Day as Guosim
Bruce Dow as Log-a-Log
Julie Lemieux as Sela Vixen
Jonathan Wilson as Chickenhound
Lawrence Bayne as Fangburn, Kilconey
Keith Knight as Squire Julian Gingivere
Dan Hennessey as Ragear
Alyson Court as Myrtle

Mattimeo 
Tim Curry as Slagar the Cruel
Michael Seater as Mattimeo
Tyrone Savage as Matthias
Melissa McIntyre as Cornflower
Janet Wright as Constance
John Stocker as Abbot Mordalfus
Richard Binsley as Basil Stag Hare
Wayne Best as General Ironbeak
Susan Roman as Jess Squirrel
Graham Haley as Foremole
Tracey Moore as Warbeak Sparra
Bruce Dow as Log-a-Log
Catherine Disher as Winifred Otter
Jake Goldsbie as Vitch
Kyle Fairlie as Cheek
Sarah Gadon as Cynthia, Tess
Kristin Fairlie as Auma
Paul Soles as Ambrose Spike
Ali Mukaddam as Jube
Alex House as Sam
Fiona Reid as Sister May
Anthony Bekenn as Orlando the Axe

Martin the Warrior 
Amos Crawley as Martin
Lindsey Connell as Rose
Diego Matamoros as Badrang
John Stocker as Tramun Clogg
Graham Haley as Grumm
Ali Mukaddam as Felldoh
Luca Perlman as Brome
Tracey Moore as Queen Amballa
Noah Reid as Keyla
Jonathan Wilson as Skalrag

Telecast and home media
Redwall was originally aired on Teletoon in Canada, along with being independently distributed in the U.S. by American Public Television through public television stations. Currently, the series is now streaming on Tubi.
The series has been released on VHS and DVD in English, French, German, Russian and Arabic. In the U.S., all three seasons were released on DVD by Funimation, while in Canada distribution was handled by Kaboom Entertainment, and then, Sony Pictures Home Entertainment re-issued Redwall: The Adventures Begin and other series on July 1, 2016. In the United Kingdom, FremantleMedia, Abbey Home Media (through its Tempo Video label) and Just Entertainment Ltd released the series on VHS and DVD. In Australia, MRA Entertainment Group and Eagle Entertainment released several volumes of the series. In Germany, m2 Verlag GmbH - Best Entertainment and Pidax have both released multiple volumes of the series on DVD. In France, StudioCanal released the first two seasons on DVD.

VHS

DVD

Notes

References

External links

Toonhound

1990s Canadian animated television series
1999 Canadian television series debuts
2000s Canadian animated television series
2002 Canadian television series endings
Animated television series about mice and rats
Canadian children's animated action television series
Canadian children's animated adventure television series
Canadian children's animated fantasy television series
Canadian children's animated supernatural television series
Canadian television shows based on children's books
Channel 5 (British TV channel) original programming
English-language television shows
French children's animated action television series
French children's animated adventure television series
French children's animated fantasy television series
French children's animated supernatural television series
French television shows based on children's books
German children's animated action television series
German children's animated adventure television series
German children's animated fantasy television series
German supernatural television series
PBS Kids shows
PBS original programming
Redwall
Teletoon original programming
Television series by Nelvana
Television series set in the Middle Ages